Kyeikdon, also spelled Kyaikdon, is a town in Kayin State, Myanmar. It is located on the eastern bank of Haungtharaw River. The government offices of Kyeikdon Subtownship are located in Kyeikdon. The majority of the town population is Karen.

References

External links
 "Kyeikdon Map — Satellite Images of Kyeikdon" Maplandia World Gazetteer

Populated places in Kayin State